In the context of the nomadic Gujjar/Bakarwal of South Asia, the terms ajar and ājaṛī (also spelt ajri), originally meaning "shepherd" in Gujjari, are used in several different ways.

Among the Bakkarwal of Jammu and Kashmir, ajṛī normally refers to a hired shepherd: a member of the community who does not have a big enough herd to subsist on and so has to hire out his labour to bigger herd owners.

The term has a different meaning in Swat, Pakistan. At the start of the 20th century, Grierson reported based on second-hand data that the Ajars there are a tribe closely related to the Gujjars, and that they speak a dialect called Ajṛī, which apart from minor variations, is "practically the same" as the one spoken by the Gujjars. This picture is contradicted by Barth, who conducted fieldwork in Swat in the 1950s. Noting the belief current among the Pathan majority that the Gujjars and Ajars are distinct ethnic subdivisions, he asserts that these two groups are only differentiated by their pattern of nomadism – the Gujars practising transhumance and the Ajars being fully nomadic – and that individual Gujjars can switch between the two.

References 

Swat District
Gurjar